ICSA Men's Singlehanded National Championship is one of the seven Inter-Collegiate Sailing Association National Championships. 

Since 1963, the winner is awarded the Glen S. Foster Trophy, named after Glen Foster for his interest in collegiate sailing and devotion to singlehanded competition. Second place finisher receives the George Griswold Trophy.

The event is sailed in cat-rigged boats which have been designed for singlehanded sailing or which are adaptable to singlehanded sailing.

The winner of this Championship may be invited to sail in United States Singlehanded Championship for the George O’Day Trophy organized by US Sailing with partial fees to be paid by ICSA.

Champions

References

External links 
GLEN S. FOSTER TROPHY

ICSA championships